Kasai shrine was the head shrine of eleven towns in the region and is classified historically as a "Gousha". It is located in Higashi Kanamachi, Katsushika district, Tokyo.

History 
Kasai shrine was founded in 1185 at the end of the Heian period. To protect the regional area, the same deity as the Katori jingu shrine, named Futsunushi no kami, was enshrined in Kasai shrine. Originally, Kasai shrine was called Katori-gu, but later on it happened to be called Kasai shrine. After World War II Kasai shrine became the religious corporation.

Enshrined deities

Futsunushi no kami

Futsunushi no kami is a symbol of the sword, which is sent to defeat evil. Because of that legend, nowadays people worship him as a symbol of achieving goals, winning, and self studying.

Yamatotakeru no mikoto

Yamatotakeru no mikoto was the son of Emperor Keiko. In the Nihonshoki, there is an old legend that says when he died, his spirit turned into a bird and flew away. He is famous for many other old legends.

Tokugawa ieyasu no mikoto

At the beginning of the Edo period, Tokugawa Ieyasu came to Kasai shrine to see the old regional puppet theater. He was astonished by the performance, so in 1591 he gave Kasai shrine a red seal as a certification to make people try harder. Because of this episode, Tokugawa Ieyasu is also enshrined as one of the deities in Kasai shrine. People nowadays worship him as a symbol of success in business, achieving goals.

Matsuribayashi 

It is said that Kasai shrine is the origin of Matsuribayashi. It is an old regional Japanese band that started in Edo Period in the eastern part of Edo. During the Kyouhou Period, one of the Shinto priests of Kasai shrine, named Nose Tamaki, taught classical verses with tunes to young people. That was the very start of Matsuribayashi. Later, it happened to be called Kasaibayashi and became very popular in the Kantō region and other areas.

After World War II, the Kasaibayashi Preservation Association was founded by some volunteers and it became an Intangible Cultural Treasure. Kasaibayashi is still played by people and once a month they practice at Kasai shrine.

Twice a year, at the time of Tori no ichi (in November) and Reitaisai (a big festival in September), they play the music in front of people at the old building (Kaguraden) in Kasai shrine.

Tori no ichi 
; there is a big festival in November (as a precursor event for Shōgatsu (Japanese New Year)), called "Tori no Ichi"; the word tori means "bird" (usually specifying a rooster), and the bird is a symbol of one of the Japanese deities, named Yamatotakeru-no-Mikoto. Nowadays people come to the festival to buy "Kumade", a Engimono talisman in the shape of a small pitchfork, wishing to have some fortune.

A karaoke tournament has been held at this festival since before World War II, and many people have participated and wait to be judged by the bell which was first used in the NHK singing tournament program.

Antique market 
Every first Saturday from 8:00 a.m. until about 5:00 p.m., there is an antique market in the Kasai shrine. This market is organized by Antique Market Committee and it is possible to see many different kinds of shops at the market with old pictures, kimono, dishes, old clocks, etc.

Cultural properties 
 Wooden drawings of Akouroushi
 Letters from Asano Nagayoshi to Kasai shrine who was working for Toyotomi Hideyoshi.
 Statue Shouki of stone
 Big ginkgo tree
 "Mikoshi" of Kasai shrine

Gallery

Access 
JR Joban line or Keisei line
10min walk from Kanamachi station

External links
 Kasai shrine official web site

Shinto shrines in Tokyo
Katsushika